C-jun-amino-terminal kinase-interacting protein 2 is a protein or the name of the gene that encodes it. The gene is also known as Islet-Brain-2 (IB2).

This protein is highly expressed in the brain and is almost always deleted in Phelan-McDermid syndrome (PMS). MAPK8IP2 appears to regulate the ratio of AMPA receptors to NMDA receptors at glutamate synapses, and thus may be an important contributor to the intellectual dysfunction and related neurological manifestations characteristic of PMS.

The protein encoded by this gene is closely related to MAPK8IP1/IB1/JIP-1, a scaffold protein that is involved in the c-Jun  amino-terminal kinase signaling pathway. This protein is expressed in brain and pancreatic cells. It has been shown to interact with, and regulate the activity of MAPK8/JNK1, and MAP2K7/MKK7 kinases. This protein thus is thought to function as a regulator of signal transduction by protein kinase cascade in brain and pancreatic beta-cells. Alternatively spliced transcript variants encoding distinct isoforms have been reported for this gene.

Interactions
MAPK8IP2 has been shown to interact with MAP3K10, Mitogen-activated protein kinase 9, LRP2, LRP1, MAPK8IP3, MAP3K12, MAPK8IP1, MAP2K7 and MAP3K11.

References

Further reading